A list of Jazz fusion albums:

1960s
 Gary Burton - Duster (1967)
 Blood, Sweat & Tears - Blood, Sweat & Tears (1968)
 Miles Davis - In a Silent Way (1969)
 The Tony Williams Lifetime - Emergency! (1969)
 Frank Zappa - Hot Rats (1969)
 Chicago - The Chicago Transit Authority (1969)

1970s
 Miles Davis - Bitches Brew (1970), A Tribute to Jack Johnson (1971), On the Corner (1972), Get Up With It (1974), Dark Magus (1974), Agharta (1975), Pangaea (1975)
 Dreams - Dreams (1970)
 Chicago - Chicago (1970)
 Nucleus - Elastic Rock (1970), We'll Talk About It Later (1971)
 Larry Coryell - Spaces (1970), Larry Coryell at the Village Gate (1971)
 The Tony Williams Lifetime - Turn It Over (1970)
 Jimmy Smith -Root Down (1972)
 Billy Cobham - Spectrum (1973)
 The New Tony Williams Lifetime - Believe It (1975), Million Dollar Legs (1976)
 Alphonse Mouzon - Mind Transplant (1975) Virtue, (1976), In Search of a Dream, (1978)
 Soft Machine - Third (1970), Fourth (1971), Six (1973), Seven (1973), Bundles (1975), Softs (1976)
 National Health - National Health (1977), Of Queues and Cures (1978)
 Mahavishnu Orchestra - The Inner Mounting Flame (1971), Birds of Fire (1972), Between Nothingness and Eternity (1973), The Lost Trident Sessions (1973), Apocalypse (1974), Visions of the Emerald Beyond (1975)
 John McLaughlin - My Goal's Beyond (1971), Love Devotion Surrender (1973)
 Herbie Hancock - Crossings (1972), Head Hunters (1973), Thrust (1974)
 Frank Zappa - Waka/Jawaka (1972), The Grand Wazoo (1972)
 Matching Mole - Matching Mole (1972)
 Weather Report - Weather Report (1971), I Sing the Body Electric (1972), Sweetnighter (1973), Mysterious Traveller (1974), Tale Spinnin' (1975), Black Market (1976), Heavy Weather (1977), Mr. Gone (1978), 8:30 (1979)
 Return to Forever - Light as a Feather (1973), Hymn of the Seventh Galaxy (1973), Where Have I Known You Before (1974), Romantic Warrior (1976), Musicmagic (1977)
 Santana - Caravanserai (1972)
 Oregon - Distant Hills (1973), Winter Light (1974)
 Jeff Beck - Blow by Blow (1975), Wired (1976)
 David Sancious - Forest Of Feelings (1975)
 Lenny White - Venusian Summer (1975)
 Gilgamesh - Gilgamesh (1975)
 Jaco Pastorius - Jaco Pastorius (1976)
 Brand X - Unorthodox Behaviour (1976), Moroccan Roll (1977)
 Al Di Meola - Land of the Midnight Sun (1976), Elegant Gypsy (1977), Casino (1978)
 Stanley Clarke - Stanley Clarke (1974), School Days (1976)
 Chick Corea - The Leprechaun (1976), My Spanish Heart (1976)
 Ralph MacDonald - Counterpoint (1977)
 Gong - Gazeuse! (1977), Expresso II (1978)
 Jean-Luc Ponty - Imaginary Voyage (1976),Enigmatic Ocean (1977), Cosmic Messenger (1978)
 Brecker Brothers - Heavy Metal Be-Bop (1978)
 Ronnie Montrose - Open Fire (1978)
 Bruford - One Of A Kind (1979)
 Pat Metheny - Pat Metheny Group (1978), American Garage (1979)

1980s
 Weather Report - Night Passage (1980), Weather Report (1982), Procession (1983), Domino Theory (1984), Sportin' Life (1985)
 Brecker Brothers - Detente (1980), Straphangin' (1981)
 Herbie Hancock - Mr. Hands (1980)
 Steps Ahead - Smokin' In The Pit (by Steps) (1980), Steps Ahead (1983), Magnetic (1986), Live In Tokyo 1986 (1994)
 Frank Zappa - Shut Up 'n Play Yer Guitar (1981)
 Miles Davis - We Want Miles (1982)
 Vital Information - Vital Information (1983)
Yellowjackets - Mirage a Trois (1983)
 Allan Holdsworth - Road Games (1983), Metal Fatigue (1985), Atavachron (1986), Sand (1987), Secrets (1989)
 Wayne Shorter - Atlantis (1985), Joy Ryder (1988)
 Bill Connors - Step It (1985)
 Don Grolnick - Hearts and Numbers (1985)
 Mike Stern - Upside Downside (1986)
 Chick Corea - Chick Corea Elektric Band (1986), Eye of the Beholder (1988)
 Scott Henderson & Tribal Tech - Dr. Hee (1987) 
 John Scofield - Blue Matter (1987), Loud Jazz (1988)
 Bob Berg - Short Stories (1987), Cycles (1988)
 Uzeb - Noisy nights (1988)
 Casiopea - Eyes of the Mind (1981)

1990s
 Chick Corea Elektric Band - Inside Out (1990)
 Jack DeJohnette - DeJohnette, Holland, Hancock, Metheny In Concert (1990 - DVD Only)
 Frank Zappa - Make A Jazz Noise Here (1991)
 Chad Wackerman - Forty Reasons (1991)
 Tribal Tech - Tribal Tech (1991), Illicit (1992), Face First (1993), Reality Check (1995), Thick (1999)
 Allan Holdsworth - Wardenclyffe Tower (1992), Hard Hat Area (1993), None Too Soon (1996)
 Bill Evans - Petite Blonde (1992)
 Shawn Lane - Powers of Ten (1992)
 Cynic - Focus (1993)
 Tom Coster - The Forbidden Zone (1994)
 Metro - Metro (1994)
 Wayne Krantz - 2 Drink Minimum (1995)
 Alain Caron - Rhythm 'n Jazz (1995)
 Mike Stern - Between The Lines (1996), Give and Take (1997)
 Pat Metheny Group - Imaginary Day (1997)
 Jonas Hellborg - Time Is the Enemy (1997)
 Steve Smith - Vital Tech Tones (1998)
 Derek Sherinian - Planet X (1999)
 Dave Weckl Band - Synergy (1999)

2000s

 Allan Holdsworth - The Sixteen Men of Tain (2000)
 Tribal Tech - Rocket Science (2000)
 Metalwood - Recline (2001)
 Derek Sherinian - Inertia (2001), Black Utopia (2003), Mythology (2004), Blood of the Snake (2006)
 CAB - CAB 2 (2001), CAB 4 (2003)
 Scott Henderson - Well to the Bone (2002), Live! (2005)
 Planet X - MoonBabies (2002), Quantum (2007)
 Christian McBride - Vertical Vision (2003)
 Alain Caron - 5 (2003)
 Garaj Mahal - Mondo Garaj (2003)
 Hiromi Uehara - Another Mind (2003), Brain (2004), Spiral (2006), Hiromi's Sonicbloom - Time Control (2007)
 Vital Information - Come On In (2004)
 Chick Corea Elektric Band - To the Stars (2004)
 Guthrie Govan - Erotic Cakes (2006)
 Karcius - Kaleidoscope (2006)
 Shawn Lane - The Tri-Tone Fascination (2001)
 Karizma - Document (2000)
 Scott Kinsey - Kinsethetics (2006)
 Metro - Express (2007)
 Allan Holdsworth, Alan Pasqua, Jimmy Haslip, Chad Wackerman - Blues for Tony (2009)

2010s
 Mike Prigodich - A Stitch In Time (CD) (2011)

2020s
 Paul Mercury - Quantum Entanglement (2020), The Family (2020)

See also
 List of jazz albums

 J
J